The Abenaki Indian Shop and Camp is a historic Native American site in the Intervale section of Conway, New Hampshire.  The site is a camp established by Abenakis who were lured to the area by the prospect of making baskets and selling them to visitors to the resort areas of the White Mountains in the late 19th century, and operated into the late 20th century.  The site was listed on the National Register of Historic Places in 1991, and has also been listed on the New Hampshire State Register of Historic Places. It is located on Intervale Cross Road, about one mile east of New Hampshire Route 16, and is now a local public park.

Description and history
The former Abenaki Indian Shop and Camp is located on the north side of Intervale Cross Road, separated from the road by the Conway Scenic Railroad.  It is a parcel of land  in size, most of which is forested in mixed hardwoods.  At the southern end is a single-story wood-frame building with a gabled roof, and a descriptive plaque set in a stone.  A short way north of this are a grouping of small shingled gable-roofed cabins, set around a small clearing in the woods.

Chief Joseph Laurent, an Abenaki leader from Odanak (St. Francis, Quebec), came to the area in 1884, and established a seasonal camp on the site, which was then owned by a local hotel. Laurent and other Abenaki produced baskets and other handicrafts as a tourist attraction for the hotel guests, and sold them the wares they produced. The Abenaki were descended from the area's original Native American population, who were driven from the area during the colonial period. The shop was originally a service shed built by the Maine Central Railroad; it was purchased by Laurent around 1900. Laurent is also credited with construction of the cottages in which the Abenaki lived. The business was continued by Laurent's son Stephen into the late 20th century. Since 1985, the property has been owned by the town, which now operates it as a small park with interpretive signage describing its history.

See also

National Register of Historic Places listings in Carroll County, New Hampshire

Notes

References

Historic districts on the National Register of Historic Places in New Hampshire
Buildings and structures completed in 1884
Buildings and structures in Carroll County, New Hampshire
National Register of Historic Places in Carroll County, New Hampshire
New Hampshire State Register of Historic Places
Conway, New Hampshire
Abenaki
Native American history of New Hampshire